Haddonfield station is a station on the PATCO Speedline rapid transit system. The station is located in Haddonfield, New Jersey, United States, near Kings Highway (New Jersey Route 41). The station is grouped with Collingswood and Westmont stations in pricing from Philadelphia.

Station layout 
Haddonfield is a two-level station. Ticketing and fare control are located on the street level. Tickets are bought from vending machines and there is a ticket counter which is open during peak times. This level also features benches and a display case. After passing through the fare control area, passengers go down to the lower level platform by stair or elevator. The escalator only goes up. The island platform is located in a large concrete trench below street level.  Besides the two tracks for PATCO, a third track for the Atlantic City Line runs through the station, but is not accessible from the platform. About a half mile in both directions, the tracks emerge back to at grade.

Notable places nearby 
The station is within walking distance of the following notable places:
 Hadrosaurus Foulkii dinosaur site
 Indian King Tavern

References

External links 
 PATCO: Haddonfield Station

PATCO Speedline stations in New Jersey
Railway stations in the United States opened in 1969
Haddonfield, New Jersey